Jaime Romero Gómez (born 31 July 1990) is a Spanish professional footballer who plays as a left winger.

Club career
Born in Valdeganga, Albacete, Romero made his professional debut with hometown's Albacete Balompié in the 2008–09 season – aged only 18 – only missing six Segunda División games out of 42, starting 26 and totalling almost 2,400 minutes as the Castile-La Mancha team retained their league status. His maiden appearance in the competition occurred on 31 August 2008 as a 75th minute substitute in a 2–1 home win against Sevilla Atlético, and he scored his first goal on 15 November, contributing to a 2–2 draw against UD Salamanca also at the Estadio Carlos Belmonte.

In summer 2009, Romero signed for Udinese Calcio in Italy. He made four league appearances in his first year in Serie A, and mainly played with the under-20 side in the Campionato Nazionale Primavera.

In late June 2010, Udinese agreed a double loan deal with A.S. Bari, subject to Romero and Andrea Coda's decision. After appearing for the former during pre-season, the former eventually moved to the Apulia club on 2 August.

After appearing in less than one fourth of the league matches, and also suffering top division relegation, Romero was loaned again, returning to his country and joining Granada CF. He made his La Liga debut on 27 August 2011, starting and being replaced in the second half of a 0–1 home loss against Real Betis.

After his loan with Granada expired, Romero represented Orduspor, Real Madrid Castilla and Real Zaragoza, all in temporary deals. On 4 July 2016, the free agent signed a two-year deal with CA Osasuna of the top level.

On 19 June 2017, after suffering relegation, Romero cut ties with Osasuna. On 8 July, however, the club announced that they received € 500,000 in a transfer to Córdoba CF.

On 17 January 2018, Romero was loaned to fellow second tier team CD Lugo for six months. On 12 June of the following year, after another relegation, he left Andalusia.

On 23 June 2019, Romero signed a contract with Qarabağ FK. He returned to Spain and its second division on 28 September 2022, signing a one-year deal with FC Cartagena, but left the club on 28 December, after just six appearances (all as a substitute).

References

External links

1990 births
Living people
Sportspeople from the Province of Albacete
Spanish footballers
Footballers from Castilla–La Mancha
Association football wingers
La Liga players
Segunda División players
Albacete Balompié players
Granada CF footballers
Real Madrid Castilla footballers
Real Zaragoza players
CA Osasuna players
Córdoba CF players
CD Lugo players
FC Cartagena footballers
Serie A players
Udinese Calcio players
S.S.C. Bari players
Süper Lig players
Orduspor footballers
Azerbaijan Premier League players
Qarabağ FK players
Spain youth international footballers
Spanish expatriate footballers
Expatriate footballers in Italy
Expatriate footballers in Turkey
Expatriate footballers in Azerbaijan
Spanish expatriate sportspeople in Italy
Spanish expatriate sportspeople in Turkey
Spanish expatriate sportspeople in Azerbaijan